The Mintzer House is a historic house at 175-177 Intervale Avenue in Burlington, Vermont.  Built as a single-family home about 1898, it is well-preserved example of vernacular Colonial Revival architecture built as worker housing.  Now a duplex, it was listed on the National Register of Historic Places in 2008.

Description and history
The Mintzer House stands near the northernmost extent of Burlington's Old North End neighborhood, on the west side of Intervale Avenue roughly midway between Willow and Oak Streets.  It is a two-story wood-frame structure, with a gabled roof, stone foundation, and an exterior finished in a combination of wooden clapboards and shingles.  A recessed porch extends partway along the left side, with an outside sheltered stairway providing access to a rear porch on the same side.  The front of the house has a three-part window on the ground floor with stained glass detailing.  The interior retains a number of original Colonial Revival details, especially in what is now the second-floor unit.

The area where the Mintzer House stands was rural for many years. Even though a subdivision including its parcel was laid out in 1855, the house was not built until about 1898, and has seen a succession of working-class immigrant residents.  The earliest documented resident was William Bessette, a French Canadian, who was a barber.  In 1906 it was acquired by the Mintzer family, Russian Jewish immigrants.  About 1919 a commercial storefront was added to the front, and part of the building was used as a small shop.  This storefront was later removed, when the building was converted to two-family use.

See also
LeFerriere House, next door
National Register of Historic Places listings in Chittenden County, Vermont

References

Colonial Revival architecture in Vermont
Houses completed in 1898
Houses on the National Register of Historic Places in Vermont
Jews and Judaism in Burlington, Vermont
National Register of Historic Places in Burlington, Vermont
Russian-Jewish culture in the United States